Taste Test is the debut extended play (EP) by Priyanka, released on July 16, 2021. Guests on the five-track collection include fellow Canada's Drag Race contestant Lemon as well as RuPaul's Drag Race UK contestant Cheryl Hole.

Composition
Priyanka has said of the EP's creative process:  She has also said: 

Fellow Canada's Drag Race contestant Lemon is featured on "Come Through" and RuPaul's Drag Race UK contestant Cheryl Hole appears on "Snatch".

Promotion
"Cake" and "Bitch I'm Busy" were released as singles on May 28 and July 14, 2021, respectively, while "Come Through" premiered on the Canada's Drag Race Anniversary Extravaganza reunion special on September 6. A launch party was held at Vancouver's Hollywood Theatre on July 17.

Four of the five songs on the EP had accompanying music videos, all of which combined into a single comedic murder mystery story parodying The Hunger Games, concluding in a video game boss battle between Priyanka and villain Cheryl Hole in the "Snatch" video. The only song without a video made was "Afterglow"; instead, the video for her non-EP Christmas single "Sleigh My Name" featured a short coda linking "Come Through" with "Snatch". Each of the videos has also featured cameo appearances by one or more of Priyanka's castmates in the first season of Canada's Drag Race; several have also included cameos by actor and dancer Donté Colley in a bit part as a television journalist reporting on the events of the videos' storyline. Several of the videos have featured choreography by Hollywood Jade.

Critical reception
The music video for "Come Through" received a nomination at the 2022 UK Music Video Awards for Best Hair & Make-Up in a Video.

Track listing

References

2021 debut EPs
EPs by Canadian artists